Roger Schmidt (born 13 March 1967) is a German professional football manager and former player. He currently manages Primeira Liga club Benfica.

He played as a midfielder in Germany's amateur regional leagues, where he began his managerial career before joining SC Paderborn 07 of the 2. Bundesliga in 2011 and Bayer Leverkusen in the Bundesliga in 2014. He won the league and cup double with Red Bull Salzburg in 2014, as well as cups with Beijing Sinobo Guoan in 2018 and PSV Eindhoven in 2022.

Football career

Playing and early managerial career
Born in Kierspe, North Rhine-Westphalia, Schmidt played as a midfielder for clubs in the region's leagues. He combined his career with studying Mechanical Engineering at Paderborn University, and then working for Benteler International.

In 2004, Schmidt was made player-manager of Delbrücker SC in the fifth-tier Verbandsliga. Two years later, with the team now one division up into the Oberliga, he retired from playing but stayed on for one further year solely as manager.

Having to balance the commitments of his marriage and young children, as well as his engineering profession, Schmidt only wanted to manage for one season but stayed for three. He decided to leave football for good, but was drawn back by interest from fellow Oberliga team SC Preußen Münster, for whom he quit his engineering job. He was appointed manager in May 2007, effective 1 July, and was sacked on 21 March 2010. Schmidt's contract stated that the club would find him an engineering job in the city of Münster should he be dismissed, but by that stage he was ready to commit solely to football management.

SC Paderborn 07
Schmidt became manager of 2. Bundesliga club SC Paderborn 07 on 1 July 2011. On his professional debut 16 days later, the team won 2–1 at Hansa Rostock. On 30 July, the team won 10–0 in the first round of the DFB-Pokal away to Rot Weiss Ahlen, though the second round was a 4–0 loss at SpVgg Greuther Fürth. His sole league season at the Benteler-Arena ended in 5th place.

Red Bull Salzburg

On 24 June 2012, Schmidt was announced as the new manager of Austrian Football Bundesliga reigning champions Red Bull Salzburg, after Ricardo Moniz. His assistant manager became Oliver Glasner. The team were eliminated from the UEFA Champions League second qualifying round by Luxembourg's F91 Dudelange in July, on the away goals rule after a 4–4 aggregate draw. Domestically, they came runners-up five points behind FK Austria Wien, and lost 2–1 in the Austrian Cup semi-finals to shock overall winners third-tier FC Pasching.

In 2013–14, Schmidt led Salzburg to the double, with an 18-point league advantage over SK Rapid Wien sealing the league title with eight games remaining. The team won 4–2 in the cup final over SKN St. Pölten.

Bayer Leverkusen
Bayer Leverkusen hired Schmidt on 25 April 2014, replacing the sacked Sami Hyypiä. His two-year contract was effective from the start of the 2014–15 season.

On Schmidt's debut, the team won 6–0 away to SV Alemannia Waldalgesheim in the first round of the cup with five goals from Stefan Kießling on 15 August; eight days later he won 2–0 at neighbours Borussia Dortmund on his Bundesliga bow. He finished his first season in fourth, lost the cup semi-final on penalties to Bayern Munich, and was eliminated from the last 16 of the Champions League on the same method against Atlético Madrid.

After his first season, Schmidt signed a new contract until 2019. On 21 February 2016, he was sent off by referee Felix Zwayer in a game against Dortmund after disputing a free kick that led to the opponents scoring the only goal of the match. He initially refused to leave, causing Zwayer to suspend the game and lead the players off the field, culminating in an eight-minute delay before the match resumed without Schmidt on the field. The 2015–16 season ended in third with Champions League qualification.

On 5 March 2017, Schmidt was sacked by sporting director Rudi Völler following a 6–2 loss at Dortmund which left Leverkusen in 9th place.

Beijing Guoan
In June 2017, Schmidt joined Chinese Super League side Beijing Sinobo Guoan on a two-and-a-half-year contract. He won the Chinese FA Cup in 2018.

On 31 July 2019, he was sacked. Hundreds of fans came to the airport for an emotional farewell when he left.

PSV Eindhoven
Schmidt became the new coach of PSV Eindhoven on 11 March 2020, on a contract until 2022. His team came second, 16 points behind Ajax in his first season, and faced the same team in the 2021 Johan Cruyff Shield which they won 4–0 on 7 August. Also against the Amsterdam-based club, PSV won the 2022 KNVB Cup Final 2–1 on 17 April.

Having not agreed an extension to his initial deal at PSV, Schmidt left at its conclusion.

Benfica
On 18 May 2022, Schmidt signed a two-year deal with Primeira Liga club Benfica. He became the second German to be appointed as manager of the club, after Jupp Heynckes. Benfica began the 2022–23 season by winning their first 13 matches across Liga and Champions League (qualifying and group stages), marking the club's best start to a season in 39 years. On 21 October, Schmidt won his first O Clássico, ending Benfica's nine-match winless run against rivals Porto. Benfica's form made the team unbeatable for 29 matches, before a 3–0 away defeat to Braga on 30 December. In Europe, Benfica's Champions League campaign amassed several records: they surpassed the Portuguese record for consecutive matches without losing in the competition, they became the first Portuguese team to reach the quarter-finals twice in a row, and they achieved their biggest home and away wins (excluding qualifying stages), 5–1 against Club Brugge and 1–6 against Maccabi Haifa, respectively.

Managerial statistics

Honours

Red Bull Salzburg
Austrian Football Bundesliga: 2013–14
Austrian Cup: 2013–14

Beijing Guoan
Chinese FA Cup: 2018

PSV Eindhoven
 KNVB Cup: 2021–22
Johan Cruyff Shield: 2021

Individual
Primeira Liga's Manager of the Month: August 2022, October/November 2022, December/January 2023

References

External links

Roger Schmidt at FuPa.net 

1967 births
Living people
People from Märkischer Kreis
Sportspeople from Arnsberg (region)
German footballers
Footballers from North Rhine-Westphalia
Association football midfielders
SC Verl players
SC Paderborn 07 players
SV Lippstadt 08 players
Oberliga (football) players
Regionalliga players
German football managers
SC Paderborn 07 managers
SC Preußen Münster managers
FC Red Bull Salzburg managers
Bayer 04 Leverkusen managers
Beijing Guoan F.C. managers
PSV Eindhoven managers
S.L. Benfica managers
Bundesliga managers
2. Bundesliga managers
Austrian Football Bundesliga managers
Chinese Super League managers
Eredivisie managers
German expatriate football managers
Expatriate football managers in Austria
German expatriate sportspeople in Austria
Expatriate football managers in China
German expatriate sportspeople in China
Expatriate football managers in the Netherlands
German expatriate sportspeople in the Netherlands
Expatriate football managers in Portugal
German expatriate sportspeople in Portugal
Paderborn University alumni
German mechanical engineers
West German footballers